Prabasi was a monthly Bengali language literary magazine edited by Ramananda Chatterjee.

History and profile
Prabasi was founded by Ramananda Chatterjee in 1901 and ran for over 60 years. It published many important Bengali authors, the most significant being Nobel laureate Rabindranath Tagore who published regularly in it from 1914 until his death. "It is no exaggeration to say that [Tagore's] major creations reached Bengali homes through [Prabasi]." There were over 350 contributors during its existence, including most of the major poet and prose writers of the day. The National Encyclopedia of Bangladesh said "Prabasi's fame remains almost unsurpassed by any other Bengali periodical." From 1901 to 1905 it was published in Allahabad. Then it was headquartered in Kolkata.

When Prabasi first appeared, it pioneered a mix of book excerpts, poetry and one-act plays, alongside reviews and essays. It also included serialized fiction, including Rabindranath Tagore's  Gora (1907-1909). It also included articles on history, art, archaeology, sociology, education, literature and literary theories, scientific topics, and travelogues. The magazine was known for its art and illustrations. It was the first ever periodical in Bengali to feature a reproduction of a photograph on its cover purely for the sake of illustration. Prabasi gave the chance to women to prove themselves as writer.

"Prabasi" literally means a "Bengali living outside Bengal", which can be translated as "Exile". Chatterjee wrote in 1903, "In truth, we are Indians first and Bengalis next."

The sister magazine of Prabasi was Modern Review. Because of the initial poor sales of Prabasi, Ramananda Chatterjee launched Modern Review in 1907, targeted to English-speaking Indians. Modern Review was a great success and was read nationwide.

Authors and works
Some of the authors and works featured in the magazine include:
 Premendra Mitra
 Rabindranath Tagore
 Nirad C. Chaudhuri
 Rakhaldas Bandyopadhyay
 Dwijendranath Tagore
 Gopal Chandra Bhattacharya
 Aranyak by Bibhutibhushan Bandopadhyay
 Sarasibala Basu
 Mukunda Das
 Jogesh Chandra Bagal

References

Bengali-language magazines
Bengali-language literature
Defunct literary magazines
Defunct magazines published in India
Literary magazines published in India
Magazines established in 1901
Magazines with year of disestablishment missing
Mass media in Allahabad
Mass media in Kolkata